Philobdella floridana is a species of leech that lives in the most southern parts of the United States. It is known only from Lake Okeechobee in Florida, and is probably conspecific with Philobdella gracilis.

References

Leeches
Invertebrates of the United States
Animals described in 1874